A cerebellar artery is an artery that provides blood to the cerebellum.

Types include:
 Superior cerebellar artery
 Anterior inferior cerebellar artery
 Posterior inferior cerebellar artery

Arteries of the head and neck